The Cassandra Palmer series is a set of fantasy novels written by Karen Chance. The series tells the story of a young woman named Cassie Palmer, a powerful clairvoyant who has the ability to communicate with the spirit realm.

The series has appeared on the New York Times and USA Today bestseller lists, with Embrace the Night reaching #6 on the New York Times Bestseller list

Characters

Cassandra Palmer
Cassandra "Cassie" Palmer is the protagonist of the series. A powerful seer, she was brought up by a vampire who wanted to monopolize her gift. She escaped him, but soon her past caught up with her, although not in the way she'd feared. The Pythia, the supernatural community's chief seer, was dying and she tapped Cassie to replace her.

That stuck Cassie with a lot of power she doesn't know how to use and a metric ton of new enemies. To make matters worse, a war has broken out in the supernatural community and everyone is choosing sides. Now Cassie is trying to stay alive long enough to figure out how to use the power of her office, and to determine what to do with it when she does.

Mircea Basarab
Mircea Basarab is a secondary character in the main series. He also has his own book, Masks, detailing his history as a five-hundred-year-old master vampire and a member of the Vampire Senate.

John Pritkin
John Pritkin is a war mage—a member of the supernatural community's police force—with a specialization in demon killing.  But then his bosses sent him on a new mission—to kill the upstart pretender to the pythia's throne, Cassie Palmer. Later in the series, Pritkin was a former war mage and the pythia's new bodyguard.

Francoise
Francoise doesn't have a last name because she was born a poor village girl in seventeenth century France.  She doesn't have much of anything else, either, after getting transported to the 21st century through an alarming series of events.  Well, that's not entirely true.  She still has her magic, and although it's seriously outdated, at least the Inquisition isn't after her anymore.  And she has a new boyfriend who would be perfect if he wasn't possessed by an ancient demon. But Francoise has learned the hard way—you have to take what you can get out of life. And she's busy taking everything she can.

Tomas
Tomas also doesn't have a last name.  He was born the bastard son of a Spanish conquistador who didn't stay around long enough to impart his surname—or much of anything else.  Tomas could have taken on his master's name, once a life-challenged Spanish nobleman took a liking to him. But after being forcibly changed into a vampire and treated as a slave for four hundred years, he wasn't feeling too chummy.  Now, all he wants is his hated master dead—permanently. He'll figure out the rest later.

Kit Marlowe
Kit Marlowe is a crossover character, appearing in both the Cassandra Palmer and Dorina Basarab series.  A spy since Elizabethan times, he currently employs his abilities on behalf of the vampire senate. Of course, Marlowe isn't just any old spy; these days, he runs the senate's spy network and he does it very well. He's best known for being handsome, charming, and knowledgeable...and cunning, sneaky and utterly ruthless.

Billy-Joe
When she was 17, Cassie bought an "ugly old necklace" from a pawn shop and discovered that it was haunted by a ghost named Billy Joe. Billy had cheated at a card game and was subsequently shoved into a sack and tossed into the Mississippi River at the age of 29. Cassie and Billy are good friends and Billy often works as a good spy because practically none of the supernatural community can see him. He helps Cassie escape from a few scrapes throughout the novels.

Louis-César
Louis-César, a master-level vampire and duelling champion of the European Senate.

Novels
Touch the Dark, June 2006, 
Claimed by Shadow, April 2007, 
Embrace the Night, April 2008, 
Curse the Dawn, April 2009, 
Hunt the Moon, June 2011, 
Tempt the Stars, October 2013, 
Masks, March 2014, ASIN B00J0H0NQK
Reap the Wind, November 2015, 
Ride the Storm, August 2017, 
Brave the Tempest, 2019
Shatter the earth, February 2020

Short stories
The Day of the Dead - currently available on Karen Chances website and also in anthology The Mammoth Book of Vampire Romance.
The Gauntlet - a Kit Marlowe short, currently available on Karen Chance's website.
The Queens Witch - a Kit Marlowe short, currently available on Karen Chance's website.
A Family Affair - a John Pritkin novella, currently available on Karen Chance's website.
Shadowland - a John Pritkin short, currently available on Karen Chance's website.

Critical reception

In 2011, the fifth entry in the series Hunt the Moon received 4.5 stars out of 5 from Romantic Times Book Reviews. "... There is never a dull moment in a Chance novel, as the action speeds from high-stakes action to death-defying exploits guaranteed to keep readers breathless. The evolution reluctant heroine Cassie undertakes as she begins to embrace her powers has been a roller-coaster ride."

Notes

External links
 Karen Chance official site

Fantasy novel series